The Fugitives is a novella by Finnish writer Johannes Linnankoski, published in 1908, and it is considered to be one of the author's most significant works, alongside The Song of the Blood-Red Flower. Set in Tavastia, a story is about agrarian society and peasants pride and reconciliation. The work has been translated up to eleven languages.

The story based on the actual events; at the time of writing the novella, Johannes Linnankoski lived at Lapinlahti in 1902, when the peasant family from Akaa settled there, and like in novella, an old couple's daughter had married an elderly widow but had an illegitimate child with another man. Shame on adultery and fear of gossip was apparently the real reason for the move to Savonia. Linnankoski transferred the events to his story. Located in the village of Alapitkä, the Hovi House, where Linnankoski lived, was at the center of the book.

Television adaptation 

References

External links 
 Finnish text, at Project Runeberg.

1908 novels
Novels set in Finland
Works published under a pseudonym
Novels adapted into television shows
20th-century Finnish novels
Finnish novels adapted into films